Rosenborg Ballklub is an association football club which currently competes in Eliteserien (formerly known as Tippeligaen) from Trondheim, Trøndelag, Norway and, at the same time, the most important in the country by far, both in terms of domestic performances as well as in terms of European record, thus surpassing close rivals Molde by a significant extent. With its rich history and tradition, the team has participated in 32 seasons of Union of European Football Associations (UEFA) club competitions, including 21 seasons in the European Cup and Champions League, 16 seasons in the UEFA Cup and Europa League, one season in the Cup Winners' Cup, and one season in the Intertoto Cup. Their home stadium is Lerkendal.

Rosenborg has played six times in the UEFA Cup after qualifying via the Champions League and once via the Intertoto Cup. It has played 206 UEFA games, resulting in 81 wins, 39 draws, and 86 defeats. The club's first appearance was in the 1965–66 European Cup Winners' Cup, and it subsequently entered tournaments in six seasons until 1974–75. The club's next appearance was in the 1986–87 European Cup, and then in the 1989–90 European Cup.

Since then, Rosenborg has been involved in a UEFA tournament every season except the 2006–07 season. The club's best performance is reaching the quarter-finals of the 1996–97 Champions League, while their only European trophy came when they co-won the 2008 UEFA Intertoto Cup.

Since the competition's introduction, Rosenborg are one of the few clubs to have advanced from the first qualifying round of the UEFA Europa League all the way to the group stage, and have achieved this on two occasions (another Norwegian club, Tromsø, were successful with the help of a disqualification).

The club plays its home matches at Lerkendal Stadion, an all-seater stadium in Trondheim. Since the last rebuilding in 2002, it can host 21,166 spectators. Rosenborg's record attendance in a European match of 22,492 dates from the 1968–69 European Cup match against Rapid Wien.

Rosenborg's biggest win is 7–1 against Astana in the 2007–08 UEFA Champions League qualification, while the biggest defeat is 1–9 against Hibernian in the 1974–75 UEFA Cup. With 133 caps, Roar Strand has appeared in the most UEFA matches for Rosenborg, while Harald Brattbakk has scored the most goals with 27. Rosenborg has played Juventus, Porto, and Real Madrid six times, more than any other team.

Key 

 S = Seasons
 P = Played
 W = Games won
 D = Games drawn
 L = Games lost
 F = Goals for
 A = Goals against
 aet = Match determined after extra time
 ag = Match determined by away goals rule

 QF = Quarter-finals
 Group = Group stage
 Group 2 = Second group stage
 PO = Play-off round
 R3 = Round 3
 R2 = Round 2
 R1 = Round 1
 Q3 = Third qualification round
 Q2 = Second qualification round
 Q1 = First qualification round
 Q = Qualification round

All-time statistics 

The following is a list of the all-time statistics from Rosenborg's games in the four UEFA tournaments it has participated in, as well as the overall total. The list contains the tournament, the number of games played (P), won (W), drawn (D) and lost (L). The number of goals scored (GF), goals against (GA), goal difference (GD) and the percentage of matches won (Win%).

As of 26 August 2021

Matches
The following is a complete list of matches played by Rosenborg in UEFA tournaments. It includes the season, tournament, the stage, the opponent club and its country, the date, the venue and the score, with Rosenborg's score noted first. It is up to date as of the end of 26 August 2021.

By club
The following list shows statistics against opposing teams Rosenborg has played three or more matches against in UEFA tournaments. It shows the club and its country, games played (P), won (W), drawn (D) and lost (L), goals for (F) and against (A). Statistics are as of the end of the 2018–19 season. The statistics include goals scored during extra time where applicable; in these games, the result given is the result at the end of extra time.

Notes
Notes

References

Bibliography

Europe
Norwegian football clubs in international competitions